The third season of The Voice Kids is Ukrainian reality singing show competition on 1+1. Tina Karol and Potap returned to the show as coaches. Natalia Mogilevskaya left the show, because she didn't win previous season. As a result, Dmitriy Monatik replaced her as a coach. 
The show premiered on October 2, 2016. It aired at 9:00 p.m. (EET) every Sunday.

Coaches

 – Winning coach/contestant. Winners are in bold,eliminated contestants in small font.
 – Runner-up coach/contestant. Final contestant first listed.

Blind auditions
During the Blind auditions, each coach must now form a team of 18 young artists.

It airs from October 2.

Color key

Episode 1 (October 2)

Episode 2 (October 9)

Episode 3 (October 16)

Episode 4 (October 23)

Episode 5 (October 30)

Episode 6 (November 6)

The Battle rounds
After the Blind Auditions, each coach had eighteen contestants for the Battle rounds. Coaches begin narrowing down the playing field by training the contestants. Each battle concluding with the respective coach eliminating two of the three contestants; the six winners for each coach advanced to the Knockouts.

Color key

Knockouts

Episode 9 (November 27) 
The Knockouts aired on November 27. Contestants were asked to sing a stripped-down version of a song in order to concentrate on the voice. Then coaches said their results where four members from each team were eliminated.

Color key:

Final

Episode 10 (December 4)

Round 1 
In this phase of the competition, each of the top six finalists took the stage and performed a solo song. The television audience choose the final three artists who advanced to the next round.

Round 2 
The final round of the competition featured the top three finalists performed a solo song. Before the start of the performances, voting lines were opened live-in-show for the television audience to vote for the final three and decide the winner. The winner of The Voice Kids was announced at the end of the show.

References 

The Voice of Ukraine
2016 Ukrainian television seasons